The 1987 Detroit Tigers season saw the Tigers make a startling late-season comeback to win the American League Eastern Division on the season's final day. The Tigers finished with a Major League-best record of 98-64, two games ahead of the Toronto Blue Jays. Detroit lost the American League Championship Series to the Minnesota Twins in 5 games.

This would be the last time the Tigers made the postseason until 2006.

Offseason
 March 23, 1987: Brian Harper was released by the Tigers.

Regular season

After their 1984 championship season, the Tigers finished in third place in the AL East in both 1985 and 1986. The 1987 Tigers faced lowered expectations –  which seemed to be confirmed by an 11–19 start to the season. The team hit its stride thereafter and gradually gained ground on its AL East rivals. This charge was fueled in part by the acquisition of pitcher Doyle Alexander from the Atlanta Braves in exchange for minor league pitcher John Smoltz. Alexander started 11 games for the Tigers, posting 9 wins without a loss and a 1.53 ERA.  The deal came at a price. Smoltz, a Lansing, Michigan native, went on to have a long, productive career with the Braves winning a Cy Young Award and eventually gaining entry into the Baseball Hall of Fame in 2015.

Despite their improvement, they entered September neck-and-neck with the Toronto Blue Jays. The two teams would square off in seven hard-fought games during the final two weeks of the season.  All seven games were decided by one run, and in the first six of the seven games, the winning run was scored in the final inning of play. At Exhibition Stadium, the Tigers dropped three in a row to the Blue Jays before winning a dramatic extra-inning showdown.

The Tigers entered the final week of the 1987 season 3.5 games behind.  After a series against the Baltimore Orioles, the Tigers returned home trailing by a game and swept the Blue Jays. Detroit clinched the division in a 1–0 victory over Toronto in front of 51,005 fans at Tiger Stadium on Sunday afternoon, October 4. Frank Tanana pitched a complete game shutout, and outfielder Larry Herndon hit a second-inning solo home run for the game's only run. Detroit finished the season with a Major League-best 98–64, two games ahead of Toronto. The team hit 225 home runs, the most since the 1961 New York Yankees.

In what would be their last postseason appearance until 2006, the Tigers lost the 1987 American League Championship Series to the underdog Minnesota Twins (who would go on to win the World Series) in five games.

The 1987 Tigers' winning percentage ranks as the 10th best in team history, as follows:

Season standings

Record vs. opponents

Transactions
 June 2, 1987: 1987 Major League Baseball Draft
Travis Fryman was drafted by the Tigers in the 1st round (30th pick). Player signed June 6, 1987.
Torey Lovullo was drafted by the Tigers in the 5th round. Player signed June 7, 1987.
 June 4, 1987: Bill Madlock was signed as a free agent by the Tigers.
 August 7, 1987: Darnell Coles and a player to be named later were traded by the Tigers to the Pittsburgh Pirates for Jim Morrison. The Tigers completed the deal by sending Morris Madden to the Pirates on August 12.
 August 12, 1987: John Smoltz was traded by the Tigers to the Atlanta Braves for Doyle Alexander.
 September 22, 1987: Dickie Noles was loaned to the Tigers by the Chicago Cubs.

Roster

Player stats

Batting

Starters by position

Note: Pos = Position; G = Games played; AB = At bats; H = Hits; Avg. = Batting average; HR = Home runs; RBI = Runs batted in

Other batters
Note: G = Games played; AB = At bats; H = Hits; Avg. = Batting average; HR = Home runs; RBI = Runs batted in

Pitching

Starting pitchers 
Note: G = Games pitched; IP = Innings pitched; W = Wins; L = Losses; ERA = Earned run average; SO = Strikeouts

Relief pitchers 
Note: G = Games pitched; W = Wins; L = Losses; SV = Saves; ERA = Earned run average; SO = Strikeouts

Farm system

References

External links

1987 Detroit Tigers team page at Baseball Reference

Detroit Tigers seasons
American League East champion seasons
Detroit Tigers
Detroit Tigers
1987 in Detroit